David Cook (born July 5, 1971) is an American politician serving as a member of the Texas House of Representatives from the 96th district. Cook was first elected in November 2020 and assumed office in January 2021. He is a member of the Republican Party and was the mayor of Mansfield, Texas, from May 2008 to January 2021.

Early life, education, and career
Cook is a graduate of Mansfield High School, Stephen F. Austin State University, and Texas Wesleyan University School of Law. He used to be an aid to former state senator, Chris Harris and worked in Harris' law firm. Cook then became a partner with Harris in January 2004 and later a managing partner of the firm. David was elected mayor of Mansfield in May 2008 and announced his resignation in December 2019, to run for the 96th district of the Texas House of Representatives.

References

External links
 Campaign website
 State legislative page

1971 births
Living people
Republican Party members of the Texas House of Representatives
Stephen F. Austin State University alumni
Texas A&M University School of Law alumni
People from Mansfield, Texas
21st-century American politicians
American lawyers
Texas lawyers